is a 1977 Japanese film directed by and starring Sachiko Hidari. It was entered into the 28th Berlin International Film Festival.

Cast
 Sachiko Hidari
 Yoshie Ichige
 Hisashi Igawa

References

External links

1977 films
1970s Japanese-language films
Films directed by Sachiko Hidari
1970s Japanese films